Louis Eugène Robert (6 December 1806 – 28 May 1882) was a French naturalist, geologist and entomologist.

Louis Eugène Robert wrote numerous works on forest insects. He was a friend of Félix Édouard Guérin-Méneville.

He made scientific voyages to Central America, Iceland, Greenland, Scandinavia and Lapland 
and was one of the naturalists on the 1836 voyage of La Recherche

External links
Wikisource France Histoire et description naturelle de la commune de Meudon
 Gaedike, R.; Groll, E. K. & Taeger, A. 2012: Bibliography of the entomological literature from the beginning until 1863 : online database - version 1.0 - Senckenberg Deutsches Entomologisches Institut. Bibliography up to 1863

French entomologists
1882 deaths
1806 births